"Gimme What I Don't Know (I Want)" is a song recorded by American singer-songwriter Justin Timberlake for his fourth studio album, The 20/20 Experience – 2 of 2 (2013). It was written and produced by Timberlake, Timothy "Timbaland" Mosley and Jerome "J-Roc" Harmon, with additional writing from James Fauntleroy.

Writing and production 
"Gimme What I Don't Know (I Want)" was written by Timberlake, Timothy "Timbaland" Mosley, Jerome "J-Roc" Harmon and James Fauntleroy. The song was produced by Timbaland, Timberlake and Harmon. Timberlake arranged and produced his vocals, which were recorded at Larabee Studios in North Hollywood, California. Harmon provided keyboards for the song, while Elliot Ives played the guitar. The track was engineered by Chris Godbey, with assistance from Alejandro Baima, and mixed by Jimmy Douglass, Godbey and Timberlake at Larabee Studios.

Composition and lyrical interpretation 

"Gimme What I Don't Know (I Want)" is an electro-funk song with an approximate length of five minutes and fifteen seconds. Time magazine writer Chris Bosman cited the song as being an "extra-smooth" combination of the funk, pop and R&B genres that shifts "unexpectedly from memorable moment to memorable moment". Amy Sciarretto of PopCrush cited "Gimme What I Don't Know (I Want)" as a "strangely compelling" pop song, and noted similarities between the song and the "sonic ethos" of Timberlake's second studio album, FutureSex/LoveSounds (2006). 411mania's Jeremy Thomas described the song as a "clear club hit" that oozes sensuality, while Paste magazine's Holly Gleason cited it as an "epic dance track". Bosman declared "Gimme What I Don't Know (I Want)" to be a "classic Timberlake" song, although he felt that it is a "watered down" version of "Don't Hold the Wall", the third track on Timberlake's third studio album, The 20/20 Experience (2013).

"Gimme What I Don't Know (I Want)" opens with Timberlake singing a cappella about animalistic carnal desire, which Drowned in Sound writer Dave Hanratty noted to be a "note-perfect transition" from "Blue Ocean Floor", the closing track on The 20/20 Experience. The song then progresses into a more "nightclub-friendly environs" that fuses typical hip hop beats with a "syncopated backbone" of acidic funk and a guitar groove that Bosman found to be reminiscent of a stripped-down version of Daft Punk's 2013 single "Get Lucky". Timberlake's vocals are supported by handclaps, blips, beeps and animal sounds.

Lyrically, Timberlake urges his lover "to get closer to your animal inside". Thomas wrote that the song's lyrics are not subtle and noted that Timberlake has "never been about subtlety".

Critical response 
Andrew Barker of Variety magazine wrote that "Gimme What I Don't Know (I Want)" opens the album effectively while being its "most winningly silly sexual imagery". On the other side, In a review of The 20/20 Experience - 2 of 2, Mesfin Fekadu of The Huffington Post stated that the album starts on the wrong note by using "Gimme What I Don't Know (I Want)" as its opener. Idolator's Carl Williott wrote that the song is a "clunky jungle-as-sex metaphor" that should have been erased when Bruno Mars's 2013 single "Gorilla" was released. Opposite, Melinda Newman of HitFix gave the song a grade A while describing it as a "sultry, sexy funky number" that introduces what is yet to come on the album.

Chris Bosman of Time magazine cited "Gimme What I Don't Know (I Want)" as one of the album's best tracks. He, however, was critical of the song's extended outro, calling it an "awkward spoken word moment" that "slams the song's already obvious metaphor of the bedroom as jungle into the beaten ground." David Meller of MusicOMH wrote that "there's nothing particularly striking" about the song, but that it's "competent enough".

Credits and personnel 
Credits adapted from the liner notes of The 20/20 Experience – 2 of 2.
Locations
Vocals recorded and mixed at Larrabee Studios, North Hollywood, California
Personnel

Timothy "Timbaland" Mosley – producer, songwriter
Justin Timberlake – mixer, producer, songwriter, vocal producer, vocal arranger
Jerome "J-Roc" Harmon – keyboards, producer, songwriter
James Fauntleroy – songwriter
Chris Godbey – engineer, mixer
Jimmy Douglass – mixer
Alejandro Baima – assistant engineer
Elliot Ives – guitar

Charts

References 

2013 songs
Justin Timberlake songs
Song recordings produced by Jerome "J-Roc" Harmon
Song recordings produced by Justin Timberlake
Song recordings produced by Timbaland
Songs written by James Fauntleroy
Songs written by Jerome "J-Roc" Harmon
Songs written by Justin Timberlake
Songs written by Timbaland